The Belknap Complex, sometimes referred to as Belknap Grove, is a complex of three giant sequoia groves located in the Tule River watershed of Giant Sequoia National Monument, just south of Camp Nelson, California. It is formed from the larger McIntyre Grove and Wheel Meadow Grove, and the smaller Carr Wilson Grove. The grove is fairly easy to reach by car given its close proximity to Highway 190. Forest Trail 31E30 meanders through the heart of the complex.

During the Castle Fire of 2020, approximately 59% of the Belknap Complex was subject to high-intensity fire, which is estimated to kill between 75 and 100% of the giant sequoia in its path.

Noteworthy trees
Some trees of special note found within the complex included:
The Patriarch Tree was destroyed in the Castle Fire.
Gutless Goliath: Remnants of a once larger tree, but still  in volume.
The Kathryn Tree: a giant sequoia tree with exceptionally large limbs.

See also
List of giant sequoia groves
List of largest giant sequoias

References

Giant sequoia groves
Sequoiadendron
Protected areas of Tulare County, California
Sequoia National Forest